Richland Hills station is a Trinity Railway Express commuter rail station in Richland Hills, Texas. It is located near Handley-Ederville Road and SH 121 and opened on September 16, 2000. The parking lot at the station was expanded in 2011.

As a result of Richland Hills residents voting to withdraw from Trinity Metro on November 8, 2016, Richland Hills station is set to be replaced by the new Trinity Lakes station currently under construction. Richland Hills station will close once Trinity Lakes station opens.

References

External links

 TRE - Richland Hills Station
 Transit-Oriented Development

Trinity Railway Express stations
Railway stations in the United States opened in 2000
Railway stations in Tarrant County, Texas